{{Infobox song
| name       = 6 of 1 Thing
| cover      = 6_of_1_Thing.JPG
| alt        =
| caption    = 
| border     = yes
| type       = single
| artist     = Craig David
| album      = Trust Me
| released   = 17 February 2008
| recorded   = Havana, Cuba
| studio     =
| venue      =
| genre      = 
| length     = 
| label      = 
| writer     = 
| producer   = {{hlist|Martin Terefe|Fraser T Smith<ref name="producer">"Craig David – 6 Of 1 Thing on Contact Music Website". contactmusic.com'. Retrieved 29 June 2008.</ref>}}
| prev_title = Hot Stuff (Let's Dance)
| prev_year  = 2007
| next_title = Officially Yours
| next_year  = 2008
| misc       = 
}}

"6 of 1 Thing" is a song by British singer Craig David. It was written by David and Fraser T. Smith for his fourth studio album Trust Me'' (2007), while production was helmed by Smith along with Martin Terefe. The song was released as the album's third single on 17 February 2008. "6 of 1 Thing" was B-listed by both BBC Radio 1 and BBC Radio 2. The song charted at number 39 in the UK Singles Chart after the physical release.

Release
"6 of 1 Thing" was released to the vast majority of Europe consumers on 18 February 2008. However, it was exclusively released to UK customers via digital download and compact disc on 18 February; online digital download site 7Digital and Woolworths stores across the UK issued the CD and maxi CD single on the Sunday, 24 hours prior to the official release date. The reason for this exclusive early release lies unconfirmed, although some say 7Digital and Woolworths had made "special arrangements" with Warner Music Group so that they were able to grab more of the market than any of their rival companies.

Music video
The music video for "6 of 1 Thing," directed by Phil Griffin, was premiered on 11 January 2008 on Craig David's official YouTube account.

Track listing
All tracks written by Craig David and Fraser T. Smith.

Notes
  signifies an additional producer

Charts

Release history

References

2008 singles
Craig David songs
Songs written by Fraser T. Smith
Song recordings produced by Fraser T. Smith
2007 songs
Sire Records singles
Warner Records singles
Songs written by Craig David